The 1957 Rebel 300 was a NASCAR Convertible Series race in Darlington, South Carolina on May 12, 1957. While the Rebel 300 was originally a convertible race, it eventually became absorbed into what is now known as the NASCAR Cup Series.  From a lineal historical standpoint, this race is the first in the lineal history of the current Darlington Cup race since 2005, the Southern 500. 

The race's name references the Confederate Memorial Day weekend of the race, which was held on the Saturday closest to Confederate Memorial Day from 1957 until 1965, and again from 1967 until 1969, and again from 2005 until 2013.  After a Saturday rainout, track president Bob Colvin decided to race on the next clear day, in violation of South Carolina blue laws (the Southern 500 was held on Monday until 1984).  Colvin was fined $58 for the violation by Sheriff Grover Bryant ($ when adjusted for inflation). Tickets for this event sold from anywhere from $5 USD ($ when adjusted for inflation) to $8 USD ($ when adjusted for inflation). The 1957 Rebel 300 was also the first NASCAR convertible race to be run on a Sunday and on Mother's Day.

Race report
Among the cars that failed to qualify for this race included Cup Series race winners Darel Dieringer, Neil Castles, Tiny Lund and Ralph Moody. While Curtis Turner and Marvin Panch dominated the early portion of the race, a series of crashes would knock most of the 27-car grid out of the race. Most of the field would be driving vehicles from either Ford or Plymouth. The 29th lap was marred by a nine-car wreck. All the drivers were born in the United States of America. Ken Rush was the last-place finisher. In the end, the race was between Joe Weatherly, Fireball Roberts and Bobby Myers.

Fireball Roberts would ultimately beat Tim Flock by two laps in front of 17,000 people. The time of the race was 2:47 with no caution laps. Lap 95 was the only time that Roberts didn't lead the race because of a pit stop. Art Binkley, Dick Beaty and Possum Jones would be the most notable drivers in the lap 29 crashes.   Beaty was later known as a NASCAR official and Bobby Myers' son Danny became a well-known mechanic in NASCAR, as a member of Richard Childress Racing's "Flying Aces" pit crew.

There was a red flag on lap 30 for 50 minutes for cleanup the track. Jim Paschal #75 blew a tire and started the big nine-car accident. Buck Baker relieved Bob Welborn on the 85th lap, Curtis Turner relieved Roger Baldwin on the 30th lap, Tiny Lund relieved Whitey Norman on the 30th lap, Jim Paschal relieved Ken Rush on the 1st lap, and Fonty Flock relieved Glen Wood on the 1st lap.

The concept of racing convertibles in NASCAR would last throughout the rest of the 1950s and into the year 1962 where the final Rebel 300 was raced before the regular Grand National cars took over in 1963. Cost-cutting measures ultimately became the reason behind the demise of the NASCAR Convertible Division.

The Rebel 300 format was changed to a twin 150-mile race for the Grand National cars in 1963, with a switch to a single race of 400 miles in 1964, 500 miles in 1974, and 400 miles in 1994. From 2005 until 2013, the Rebel 500 ran on the traditional Mother's Day / Confederate Memorial Day weekend date of the first Rebel, with the 2007 race -- 50 years since the first Rebel 300 being rained out and racing on the Sunday itself.  In 2014, the Rebel was held in April, and moved back to September in 2015.

Finishing order

Timeline

References

Rebel 300
Rebel 300
NASCAR races at Darlington Raceway